The 1976 All-Ireland Senior Hurling Championship was the 90th staging of the All-Ireland Senior Hurling Championship, the Gaelic Athletic Association's premier inter-county hurling tournament. The championship began on 2 May 1976 and ended on 5 September 1976.

Kilkenny were the defending champions but were defeated by Wexfoprd in the Leinster final.

On 5 September 1976, Cork won the championship following a 2–21 to 4–11 defeat of Wexford in the All-Ireland final at Croke Park. This was their 22nd All-Ireland title overall and their first title since 1970.

Wexford's Mick Butler was the championship's top scorer with 3-20. Wexford's Tony Doran was the choice for Hurler of the Year.

Results

Leinster Senior Hurling Championship

Munster Senior Hurling Championship

All-Ireland Senior Hurling Championship

Championship statistics

Top scorers

Overall

In a single game

Broadcasting

The following matches were broadcast live on television in Ireland on RTÉ.

Player facts

Retirements 
The following players made their retirement in the 1976 championship:

References

All-Ireland Senior Hurling Championship